Lawrence "Chubby" Woodman was an entrepreneur and restaurant owner who legend has it invented the fried clam. He opened Woodman's of Essex, first as a clam shack, with his wife Bessie on Main Street in Essex, Massachusetts and sold freshly dug steamer clams as well as ice cream and homemade potato chips.

Legend has it that Woodman invented fried clams on July 3, 1916.  According to the company website this happened during a visit from a friend and fisherman, Mr. Tarr of neighboring Gloucester. Chubby took his suggestion to put some clams into the oil used for deep-frying the potato chips. Some modifications were made, such as dipping the clams in evaporated milk and corn flour, and the fried clam was born.

Chubby Woodman's clam related innovations continued with the idea of mobilizing New England clam bake. He used a truck loaded with food, boilers, and wood, and the clambake was done at the customer's preferred location. Woodman's restaurant now sells "clambakes to go," consisting of all the necessary ingredients such as lobster, clams, potatoes, and corn.

Woodmans' legacy and his restaurant's focus on clams was adversely impacted in 2005 by a severe red tide tightening the clam supplies and causing price increases. Woodman's was forced to import clams from Canada.

Family and legacy 
Eventually, the family business came into the hands of Chubby’s son, Lawrence Dexter Woodman, commonly referred to as "Deck," and his wife Virginia. After his death in 1987, Deck’s children and grandchildren founded the L. Dexter Woodman Scholarship Fund. The scholarship provides scholarships of $20,000 to two local high school seniors to help them toward college; applicants are judged on character and community service, as well as on academics, extracurricular activities, and need. The scholarship fund hosts two main fundraising events each May, the "Taste of Essex," a tasting event with local food, and "Deck’s Day for Dubbers," a golf tournament.

Reputation
Woodman's reputation is recognized in many travel and restaurant guides, such as Frommer's New England, Frommer's Boston 2006 and Boston 2007, and their Irreverent Guide to Boston. Fodor included the restaurant in their Where to Weekend Around Boston, and the Phantom Gourmet Guide to Boston's Best Restaurants 2008 affirms it has the best fried clams.

References

Businesspeople from Massachusetts